Reuben Reid Gaines (October 30, 1836 – October 13, 1914) was a justice of the Supreme Court of Texas from 1886 to January 1911. He served as the court's chief justice from 1894 until his retirement in 1911.

References

Justices of the Texas Supreme Court
1836 births
1914 deaths
19th-century American judges